Josh Sole (born 15 February 1980) is a retired New Zealand born rugby union player, currently playing for Heartbeat Tigers Rugby Union in Dubai. He has been capped for the Italian national team, making his debut in 2005 against Argentina. His usual position was number 8.

References

External links
RBS 6 Nations profile
http://www.itsrugby.co.uk/player_1830.html

1980 births
New Zealand rugby union players
New Zealand people of Italian descent
New Zealand people of Scottish descent
Italian people of New Zealand descent
Italy international rugby union players
Zebre Parma players
Bay of Plenty rugby union players
Rugby Viadana players
Aironi players
Rugby union number eights
Rugby union locks
Rugby union players from Hamilton, New Zealand
Living people